Linda Kasenda is a Malawian footballer who plays as a forward for  the Malawi women's national team.

International goals

References

Living people
Malawian women's footballers
Women's association football forwards
Malawi women's international footballers
Year of birth missing (living people)